A Perfect Mystery is an album by the Legendary Pink Dots, released in 2000.

Production
The band tried a different method to recording on A Perfect Mystery, working on the songs together in the studio instead of constructing them from ideas already developed by individual members.

Critical reception
The Washington Post wrote that the album "finds the Dots in good form, combining contemporary electronics with '70s jazz-rock touches in the service of goth-cabaret-folk-rock songs." The Plain Dealer wrote that "the dense, highly textured sounds reveal the band members' interests in the more adventurous aspects of techno and industrial music, but the music feels purposeful, not indulgent." The Times-Picayune thought that A Perfect Mystery alternates "pulsing, up-tempo rockers with moodier pieces interlaced with spooky keyboards and an effects-laden saxophone."

Track listing
 Lent 
 When I'm With You 
 When Lenny Meets Lorca 
 Skeltzer Spleltzer 
 Mood 159 
 Pain Bubbles 
 Blue 
 Condition Green 
 Death Of A King 
 Godless 
 Premonition 25 (vinyl issue bonus track)

Credits
Qa'Sepel - voice, keyboards
The Silverman (Phil Knight) - keyboards, filters, sound processing, voices from beyond 
Ryan Moore - bass, drums, percussion, sound processing
Martijn de Kleer - guitars, violin, drums and bass
Niels van Hoornblower - saxophones, flute, bass clarinet, percussion
Frank Verschuuren - sound processing

References

The Legendary Pink Dots albums
2000 albums